The Malibu Painter was an Ancient Roman painter of Fayum mummy portraits active in Egypt between about 75 and 100 AD.  Three portraits have been attributed to him, based on his manner of painting highlights and shadow and the distinctive form of the noses and mouths in his portraits.  Two paintings were found at Hawara, and it appears that the painter was primarily active in nearby Arsinoe.  The artist's name is derived from a portrait of a woman now found in the J. Paul Getty Museum in Malibu, Los Angeles.

See also 
 Notname: name of convenience for an artist

References

External links
Malibu Painter at the Getty Museum

Ancient Roman painters
Anonymous artists of antiquity
1st-century Romans
1st-century Egyptian people
1st-century painters